Jisa-ye Khezrabad (also Romanized as Jīsā-ye Khez̤rābād; also known as Jīsā-ye Bālā and Jīsā-ye ‘Olyā) is a village in Kelarabad Rural District, Kelarabad District, Abbasabad County, Mazandaran Province, Iran. At the 2006 census, its population was 368, in 104 families.

References 

Populated places in Abbasabad County